Coptic Epact Numbers is a Unicode block containing old Coptic number forms.

These numbers were used in some regions instead of letters of the Coptic alphabet that were used for encoding numbers, as was common in much of the world at the time, like Roman numerals. It was used most extensively in the Bohairic dialect of the Coptic language that became the liturgical language of Egyptian Christians. It contains separate characters for each of the digits, 1-9 (0 was not indicated), each of the tens numbers from 10-90, and each of the hundreds numbers from 100-900. Numbers were composed from left-to-right by successively adding the values that each character or digit represented. There is a thousand mark diacritic that multiplies the digit by one thousand (so 5 with thousand mark = 5,000, 900 with thousand mark indicates 900,000) Two of the thousands marks together (visually similar to a tanween al-kasra in Arabic) represents a million in a similar fashion, and mirrors other Coptic conventions of indicating higher orders by repetition of marks.

History
The following Unicode-related documents record the purpose and process of defining specific characters in the Coptic Epact Numbers block:

References 

Unicode blocks